Thornton Junction TMD was a traction maintenance depot located in Thornton, Fife, Scotland. The depot is situated on the Fife Circle Line and was near  station until it closed.

The depot code is TJ.

History 
The station used to have sidings,  but they closed in 1969 and were replaced with the depot. Between 1956 and 1970, they were used to stable Class 05, 06, 08 shunters, Class 11, 20 and 27 locomotives. In 1987, the depot had an allocation of Class 20, 25, 26, 27 locomotives and a withdrawn Class 104 DMU. The DMU has now been scrapped.

Present 
The depot is now closed.

References 

Railway depots in Scotland
Buildings and structures in Fife
1933 establishments in Scotland